The men's javelin throw event at the 2008 World Junior Championships in Athletics was held in Bydgoszcz, Poland, at Zawisza Stadium on 9 and 11 July.

Medalists

Results

Final
11 July

Qualifications
9 July

Group A

Group B

Participation
According to an unofficial count, 26 athletes from 20 countries participated in the event.

References

Javelin throw
Javelin throw at the World Athletics U20 Championships